Chertov, Chortov or Chertoff (Russian: Чертов) is a Russian masculine originating from the word chort, meaning devil, demon. Its feminine counterpart is Chertova or Chortova. The surname may refer to the following notable people:

Benjamin Chertoff, American journalist, photographer and video producer
Daniil Chertov (born 1990), Russian professional football player
Michael Chertoff (born 1953), American attorney
Rick Chertoff (born 1950), American music producer

See also
Chertov Ovrag, an archaeological site on Wrangel Island, Russia

References

Russian-language surnames